This is a list of minister from Arjun Munda cabinets starting from 12 March 2005 – 8 September 2006. Arjun Munda is the leader of Bharatiya Janata Party was sworn in the Chief Ministers of Jharkhand in 12 March 2005. Here is the list of the ministers of his ministry.

Arjun Munda along with five Independent MLAs, took oath of office on 12 March and on 29 March, two ministers from Bharatiya Janata Party, two minister from  Janata Dal (United)  and one from minister from Nationalist Congress Party who switched over to the Bharatiya Janata Party before swearing in.

Ministers

See also 

 Government of Jharkhand
 Jharkhand Legislative Assembly
 Arjun Munda first ministry
 Arjun Munda third ministry

References

Bharatiya Janata Party state ministries
Janata Dal (United)
2005 in Indian politics
Jharkhand ministries
All Jharkhand Students Union
2005 establishments in Jharkhand
2006 disestablishments in India
Cabinets established in 2005
Cabinets disestablished in 2006